Dixie Peabody (December 11, 1947 – February 28, 2005) was an American actress who appeared in early 1970s exploitation films from Roger Corman’s New World Pictures. Before she became an actress, she was a model who went by the name Diane Potter.

Born in San Diego, the six-foot-tall actress is best known for her starring role in the Barbara Peeters–directed low-budget drive-in film Bury Me an Angel, her first real role aside from an uncredited appearance as a biker chick in Angels Die Hard. She also appears in Night Call Nurses and worked as a production assistant on Peeters’ Summer School Teachers (her last known credit).

References

External links

1947 births
2005 deaths
20th-century American actresses
American film actresses
Actresses from San Diego
Place of death missing
21st-century American women